Montecatini was an important Italian chemicals company founded in 1888. It was called: quasi-monopolist of the Italian chemical industry in the time between World War I and the end of World War II. Problems led to a merger with the Edison company in 1966 forming the Montedison company.

History
The company was founded as a small mining business in Montecatini Val di Cecina operating a copper pyrite mine in 1888.
The production increased and a shift from copper ore production to pyrite production as a starting material for sulfuric acid production when Guido Donegani was made director in 1910.

Large amounts of sulfuric acid are used for the production of superphosphate fertilizers and therefore Montecatini expanded into this business. By 1920 the company had acquired the two largest phosphate fertilizer producers Unione Concimi and Colla e Concimi. The company became dominant in chemical industry of Italy during the time of Fascist Italy. Montecatini collaborated with RIAP of Bergamo and together developed an extrusion machine. Montecatini was also involved in the creation of Lake Reschen which submerged the village of Graun.

See also

 List of Italian companies
 Covema Group

References

Chemical companies of Italy
Italian companies established in 1888